Sinitsyno is a rural locality (a village) in Kubenskoye Rural Settlement, Vologodsky District, Vologda Oblast, Russia. The population was 12 as of 2002.

Geography 
Sinitsyno is located 70 km northwest of Vologda (the district's administrative centre) by road. Davydkovo is the nearest rural locality.

References 

Rural localities in Vologodsky District